Moisés Fuentes Rubio (20 September 1985 – 24 November 2022) was a Mexican professional boxer who held the WBO minimumweight title from 2011 to 2013 and the WBO interim junior flyweight title from 2013 to 2014.

Professional career
On 6 February 2010, Fuentés won a ten-round unanimous decision over Mexican Eduardo González to capture the interim WBC Youth minimumweight title in Guadalajara, Jalisco.

WBO minimumweight champion
On 27 August 2011, Fuentés won a twelve-round split decision over Raúl García to capture the WBO minimumweight title. The bout was held at the Auditorio Benito Juárez, in Guadalajara.

Personal life and death
Fuentes suffered a blood clot in his brain as the result of a 2021 fight with David Cuellar. He never fought again after that and complications from the injury resulted in his death at the age of 37 on November 24, 2022.

Professional boxing record

See also
List of Mexican boxing world champions
List of WBO world champions
List of strawweight boxing champions

References

External links

1985 births
2022 deaths
Mexican male boxers
Boxers from Mexico City
Mini-flyweight boxers
World mini-flyweight boxing champions
World Boxing Organization champions
20th-century Mexican people
21st-century Mexican people
Deaths due to injuries sustained in boxing